John Plunket or Plunkett may refer to:

 John Plunket (judge) (c. 1497–1582), Irish politician and judge, Lord Chief Justice of Ireland
 John Plunket (Jacobite) (1664–1738), Irish Jacobite
 John Plunket, 3rd Baron Plunket (1793–1871), Irish peer and Queen's Counsel
 John Plunkett (1802–1869), Attorney-General of New South Wales
 John Plunkett, 17th Baron of Dunsany (1853–1899), Anglo-Irish politician and peer
 John Plunkett, 3rd Baron of Dunsany (died 1500), Anglo-Irish nobleman